The India A cricket team and the West Indies A cricket team played a List-A Tri-series and first-class matches in England between June and July 2018. Prior to Tri Series India A and West Indies A played warm up matches against County Clubs. India A won the tri series.

Squads 

Ishan Kishan replaced Sanju Samson for the tri-series as Sanju Samson failed a fitness test conducted by BCCI. Sam Curran and Craig Overton were selected for final two ODIs against Australia.Curran was ruled out for whole series. Overton was replaced by Chris Jordan for first two matches in England Lions’s squad.

Warm-up Matches

1st List A warm-up Match : England Cricket Board XI vs India A

2nd List A warm-up Match : Warwickshire vs West Indies A

3rd List A warm-up Match : Leicestershire vs India A

4th List A warm-up Match : Worcestershire vs West Indies A

Tri-series

Points Table

Matches

Final

India 'A' vs West Indies 'A' First-class series

Squads

Rishabh Pant was not selected initially but was added later to the India A squad.

First Class Series

1st First Class Match

2nd First Class Match

India 'A' vs England Lion's First-class match

Squads

Only First Class Match

West Indies 'A' vs Surrey First-class match

Squads

Only First Class Match

Notes

References 

A team cricket
2018 in Indian cricket